USS Pavlic (APD-70) was built by Dravo Corporation at Pittsburgh, Pennsylvania as a Buckley-class destroyer escort. Pavlic was launched 18 December 1943 and towed to Texas for refitting as a United States Navy high-speed transport. Pavlic was in commission from 1944 to 1946, serving in the Okinawa campaign as a radar picket ship. Pavlic was decommissioned 15 November 1946.  After more than 20 years of inactivity in reserve, she was stricken from the Navy List on 1 April 1967. On 1 July 1968, she was sold for scrapping to North American Smelting Company.

Namesake

Milton Frank Pavlic was born on 27 December 1909 in Trieste, Italy, and grew up in Rittman, Ohio. During the 1927-1928 academic year he attended Western Reserve University in Cleveland, Ohio, as a pre-medical student. He was appointed a midshipman on 25 June 1928. He attended the United States Naval Academy in Annapolis, Maryland, and was commissioned as an Ensign on 2 June 1932.

From 17 June 1940 to 9 March 1942 he served at the Naval Academy. He then helped fit out the new battleship , and was on board her when she was commissioned on 20 March 1942. He was promoted to lieutenant commander on 15 June 1942. In the Naval Battle of Guadalcanal early on 15 November 1942, South Dakotas task force engaged a force of Japanese warships and was badly damaged in the action and he was killed in the battle. He was posthumously awarded the Purple Heart.

Construction and commissioning
USS Pavlic (DE-669) was laid down as a Buckley-class destroyer escort on 21 September 1943 by the Dravo Corporation at Pittsburgh, Pennsylvania. USS Pavlic was launched 18 December 1943, sponsored by Mrs. Milton F. Pavlic. After launching, USS Pavlic was towed to Orange, Texas, for fitting out at the Consolidated Shipbuilding Company shipyard. After a six-month-long conversion, USS Pavlic was reclassified as a Charles Lawrence-class and was renamed USS Pavlic APD-70 on 27 June 1944. After her conversion, she was re-commissioned at Orange, Texas on 29 December 1944.

Service history

World War II
After her shakedown cruise off Bermuda and amphibious warfare training at Portsmouth, Virginia, USS Pavlic departed Norfolk, Virginia, on 22 February 1945 for World War II service against the Japanese in the Pacific. She steamed via the Panama Canal to San Diego, California, before moving on to Pearl Harbor, Territory of Hawaii, where she arrived on 21 March 1945. Following training exercises in Hawaii, she departed Pearl Harbor on 13 April 1945 and steamed to Majuro Atoll in the Marshall Islands. She then stopped at Ulithi Atoll in the Caroline Islands before arriving in the Ryukyu Islands to participate in the Okinawa campaign

From 3 to 9 May 1945, Pavlic was stationed on the picket line off Okinawa, fighting off several Japanese air raids and performing rescue work. On 5 May 1945 her crew picked up the remains of USS LSM(R)-195 crew man, George J.Ruhlman, after his ship was sunk by a Kamikaze attack off Okinawa on 4 May 1945.

On 10 May 1945, she escorted the hospital ship  to Guam, then returned to Hagushi Anchorage off Okinawa on 12 May 1945 to resume patrol work.

On 18 May 1945, Pavlic was designated as a "special rescue vessel" and continued her rescue work while undergoing several heavy Japanese air raids.

On 27 May 1945, Pavlic repelled her first direct Japanese kamikaze suicide attack. On 28 May 1945, she opened fire on a low-flying Japanese Mitsubishi G4M "Betty" bomber which was operating as a torpedo bomber, causing it to veer away. Pavlic and her sister ship, the high-speed transport , picked up survivors from the destroyer , which had been sunk by two kamikaze attacks. Once the survivors were aboard, Pavlic sailed for Hagushi Anchorage for medical exam and wound dressing. On 29 May 1945 she picked up survivors from destroyer USS Shubrick (DD-639), which also had been damaged by a suicide plane.

For the remainder of World War II Pavlic continued to serve in the Pacific war zone, primarily in the Ryukyu Islands.

On 14 August 1945, Pavlic got underway, joining the United States Third Fleet off Tokyo, Japan. World War II ended with the surrender of Japan on 15 August 1945.

Postwar
On 18 August 1945, Pavlic made rendezvous with the British Pacific Fleet and took on board a Royal Navy and Royal Marine amphibious landing force from the British light cruiser HMS Newfoundland and the Royal New Zealand Navy light cruiser HMNZS Gambia. The landing forces returned, and Pavlic proceeded to Yokosuka Ko.

On 31 August 1945, with L Company of the United States Marine Corpss 4th Marine Regiment embarked, Pavlic made the short run to Tateyama Bay to secure the large Japanese naval air station there and remained there until 3 September 1945 supporting the Marines. On 3 September, after a United States Army occupation regiment relieved them, she reembarked the Marines and returned to Yokosuka Ko. On 9 September 1945, Pavlic was designated as a barracks ship.

On 15 April 1946, Pavlic departed Japan for the United States and, after a stop at San Diego and overhaul at the Philadelphia Naval Shipyard at Philadelphia, Pennsylvania, and the Charleston Naval Shipyard at Charleston, South Carolina, was towed to Green Cove Springs, Florida, for inactivation.

Decommissioning and disposal
USS Pavlic was decommissioned at Green Cove Springs on 15 November 1946, and placed in the Florida Group of the Atlantic Reserve Fleet on the St. Johns River. After more than 20 years of inactivity in reserve, she was stricken from the Navy List on 1 April 1967. Three months later, on 1 July 1968, she was sold to North American Smelting Company as scrap.

Honors and awards
Pavlic received one battle star for her World War II service in the Okinawa campaign.

Notes

References
 

USS Pavlic – APD-70: A History
NavSource Online: Amphibious Photo Archive USS Pavlic (APD-70)

Charles Lawrence-class high speed transports
World War II amphibious warfare vessels of the United States
Ships built in Pittsburgh
Ships built in Orange, Texas
1943 ships
Ships built by Dravo Corporation